The Church of San Pedro Apóstol (Spanish: Iglesia de San Pedro Apóstol) is a medieval church located in Vitoria, Spain.

It was declared a national monument in 1931 and is currently classed as a Bien de Interés Cultural.

References

External links 

Churches in Álava
Bien de Interés Cultural landmarks in Álava
Gothic architecture in the Basque Country (autonomous community)